The Three Nations Senior Lacrosse League (TNSLL) is a Senior B box lacrosse league based out of Ontario, Quebec and New York, sanctioned by the First Nations Lacrosse Association (FNLA). The league champion earns a spot in the Presidents Cup, the national championship of Senior B lacrosse in Canada.

History

2009 
Akwesasne Thunderbirds, Cornwall Island Redmen and Massena Muskies played an inter-league schedule with the Quebec Senior Lacrosse League (QSLL). Cornwall swept Akwesasne in three-straight games (7-5; 16-6; 11-10) in the opening round before being swept in the finals (9-7; 14-4; 9-5) by Massena.

2010 
Snake Island Muskies (formerly Massena) swept their opening round playoff series (20-2; 22-6; 17-13) to meet the Redmen in the finals. Cornwall Island won in three-straight games (9-5; 6-5; 10-3).

2011 
The league grew to four teams with the addition of Caughnawaga Indians (previously competed in Circuit Québécois de Crosse) and St. Regis Braves.

The Muskies got some revenge from the previous seasons by knocking out the Redmen four-games-to-two (5-13; 9-8; 13-7; 8-4; 9-10; 13-7). In the finals Snake Island upset top seed St. Regis in five games (9-5; 11-13; 8-7; 8-12; 8-7). Both teams would advance to the Presidents Cup with the Braves playing host in Akwesasne.

In the round robin St. Regis Braves went a perfect 6-0 while the Muskies 4-2-1 record was second-best. The Braves defeated Snake Island 11-8 in the gold medal game.

2012 
St. Regis swept the Redmen in four games (16-11; 15-8; 20-7; forfeit) in the league finals. The Braves would go on to win their second-straight Presidents Cup.

2013 
Three teams made up the TNSLL (St. Regis Braves went on hiatus). Snake Island Muskies were the top seed in the Wally Roundpoint Memorial Cup playoffs. They would face the Caughnawaga Indians, who they narrowly topped for the top spot, in a best-of seven finals as the Indians eliminated the Redmen (17-8; 12-10; 9-8). A four games-to-one series (6-11; 12-10; 15-11; 11-10; 8-6) win earned Caughnawaga Indians a spot in the Presidents Cup.

Notable players from the champion Caughnawaga Indians included the Thompson brothers (Jeremy, Jerome, Miles and Lyle) cousin Ty Thompson. Miles and Lyle went on to be named co-winners of the 2014 Tewaraaton Award after their season with the University at Albany.

2014 
The regular season included an 18-game schedule, each team playing the other six times. Snake Island Muskies (14-4) won the regular season, finishing just ahead of second place Akwesasne Outlawz (13-5). Caughnawaga Indians (7-11) and Tyendinaga Wolfpack (2-16) finished well behind the top two.

Snake Island easily got past the Wolpack (23-12; 20-7; forfeit) while the Muskies eliminated Caughnawaga (29-4; 20-5; forfeit). The best-of five championship series was won by Akwesasne after a thrilling four-games (8-9, 9-8, 13-9, 10-7) with Snake Island.

2015 
With the Akwesasne and Caughnawaga both on hiatus, Snake Island Muskies (9-7) and Tyendinaga Wolfpack (0-6) played an inter-league schedule against QSLL teams. The TNSLL championship was contested in a one-game playoff on August 8 at Deseronto Community Recreation Centre, won by the Muskies 21-9.

2016 
Two teams (Caughnawaga Indians, St. Regis Braves) returned while three-time champion Snake Island Muskies went on hiatus. Tyendinaga changed their name from Wolfpack to Thunderbirds.

Tyendinaga eliminated Caughnawaga in three straight to earn a spot in the finals. The Thunderbirds went on to upset St. Regis in the finals to earn their first-ever berth to Presidents Cup.

Teams

Former member teams 

 Akwesasne Outlawz (2014)
 Akwesasne Thunderbirds (2009-10)
Caughnawaga Indians - went on hiatus for 2019**
 Cornwall Island Redmen (2009-13) - renamed Akwesasne Outlawz (2014)
 St. Regis Braves (2009-12) - ceased operations - returned (2016-18) - went on hiatus for 2019**
 Tyendinaga Wolfpack/Thunderbirds (2014-17)

Champions

Presidents Cup medal history

References

External links 
TNSLL website
@TNSLL

Lacrosse leagues in Canada
Lacrosse leagues in the United States
Sports leagues established in 2009